One Hundred Days: The Story of Architects Almost World Tour (or simply One Hundred Days) is a documentary about British metalcore band Architects' Daybreaker Almost World Tour, a promotional tour for their fifth studio album Daybreaker. The funding for the film was achieved through a crowd funding project on Indiegogo, where they had a target of £30,000 to reach, but they reached over £10,000 of that sum.

Background
One Hundred Days is the filming of Architects' Daybreaker Almost World Tour which took place in 2012 where they played 75 shows in 25 countries over 4 continents. The documentary is primarily narrated by Architects''' bassist Alex Dean and guitarist Tom Searle. One Hundred Days was directed by and filmed by Tom Welsh, who followed the band on the entire tour. The tour was very ambitious and took them to areas of the world they've never toured in like: China, Hong Kong, Thailand, Singapore, Malaysia, Indonesia and New Zealand and completed their first headline tour of Mainland Europe.Architects wanted the documentary to provide a real portrayal of what it's like to tour in a band of their size. Sam Carter commented on the honesty of the portrayal stating "we wanted to film the ups and downs of not a really big band[...] we're really modest about what we do". They also commented that it was similar to Parkway Drive: The DVD, only scaled down.

The Almost World Tour's touring schedule

Production and release

In mid April 2013, the band released a trailer for the documentary The band decided to self-release the film since they had left their record label Century Media and the funding for the film was done through a community funded project on indiegogo. For the crowd funding campaign the band used a target budget of £30,000 to measure the demand for the film saying "We don't know whether to manufacture 10 or 10,000 copies of this DVD/Blu Ray and this campaign will give us a solid idea of the numbers we should be looking to create". They used a community fund project to "cut the middle man out but also to allows us to gain an idea of demand". The contributions to the project ranged, with £1 being to have the persons names in the credits to £50 for tickets to watch the film debut at a cinema in Brighton.

During the campaign- once the target amount had been surpassed- Architects posted a song clip of a new song "Black Blood" online to tease the release of Daybreaker's'' deluxe version. With the closing of the crowd funding campaign 1907 copies of the copies of the film were purchased in digital, DVD and Blu-ray formats and a total funding of £40,891 was achieved.

The film debuted at the Brighton cinema Duke of Yorks on 8 June.

References

2013 films
British documentary films
Indiegogo projects
Documentary films about heavy metal music and musicians
Crowdfunded films
2010s English-language films
2010s British films